AskReddit, sometimes stylized as Ask Reddit or Ask Reddit..., is a subreddit on the website Reddit, where users can submit open-ended questions to which other users can then reply. The subreddit describes its focus as "to ask and answer questions that elicit thought-provoking discussions". As of July 2015, AskReddit was the most popular subreddit on all of Reddit, and as of September 2021, it has 33.5 million members. In November 2018, Kevin Wong of Complex wrote:

References

External links

AskReddit
Internet properties established in 2008
English-language websites
Question-and-answer websites